Mikhail Sergeyevich Akimenko (born 6 December 1995) is a Russian high jumper.

He won the title, with a personal best of 2.24 m, at the 2014 World Junior Championships.
He jumped 2.33 m in Cheboksary in July 2019. On 10 September 2019 he was registered to compete as part of the Authorised Neutral Athletes team at the 2019 World Championships in Doha where he would win the silver medal, with a jump of 2.35 m.

References

External links

1995 births
Living people
Russian male high jumpers
People from Prokhladny, Kabardino-Balkar Republic
Sportspeople from Kabardino-Balkaria
Authorised Neutral Athletes at the World Athletics Championships
World Athletics Championships medalists
World Athletics U20 Championships winners
Russian Athletics Championships winners
Athletes (track and field) at the 2020 Summer Olympics
Olympic athletes of Russia